The Indemnity and Oblivion Act 1660 was an Act of the Parliament of England (12 Cha. II c. 11), the long title of which is "An Act of Free and General Pardon, Indemnity, and Oblivion". This act was a general pardon for everyone who had committed crimes during the English Civil War and subsequent Commonwealth period, with the exception of certain crimes such as murder (without a licence granted by King or Parliament), piracy, buggery, rape and witchcraft, and people named in the act such as those involved in the regicide of Charles I. It also said that no action was to be taken against those involved at any later time, and that the Interregnum was to be legally forgotten.

History
The Indemnity and Oblivion Act fulfilled the suggestion given in the Declaration of Breda that reprisals against the establishment which had developed during the English Interregnum would be restricted to those who had officiated in the regicide of King Charles I.

The passage of the Indemnity and Oblivion Act through the Convention Parliament was secured by Lord Clarendon, the first minister of King Charles II, and it became law on 29 August 1660 during the first year of the English Restoration.

The lands of the Crown and the established Church were automatically restored, but lands of Royalists and other dissenters confiscated and sold during the Civil War and interregnum were left for private negotiation or litigation, meaning that the government would not help the Loyalists in regaining their property. Disappointed Royalists commented that the Act meant "indemnity for [Charles'] enemies and oblivion for his friends". Historians, on the other hand, have generally praised the King and Clarendon for the generosity and clemency of the Act, in an age not normally noted for mercy. Twenty years later, during the Popish Plot, Charles tried unsuccessfully to stand against the relentless demand for the execution of Catholic priests, and reminded the public sharply of how many of them had previously benefited from his reluctance to shed blood.

The act is often viewed from the perspective of those who were not pardoned and thus condemned to death. However, the debate in Parliament continued almost every day for over two months and names were added and taken off the list of those who were not to be pardoned. Initially, there were only seven on the list:  Thomas Harrison, William Say, John Jones Maesygarnedd, Thomas Scot, John Lisle, Cornelius Holland, and John Barkstead. On 7 June, the Commons, mindful of the Declaration of Breda, stated they as the Commons could add to the list others who would not be covered by the general pardon. They immediately added John Cooke, Andrew Broughton, Edward Dendy, and the "Two Persons who were upon the Scaffold in a Disguise" (i.e. the executioners). On 8 June, the Commons voted "That the Number of Twenty, and no more, (other than those that are already excepted, or sat as Judges upon the late King's Majesty) shall be excepted out of the Act of general Pardon and Oblivion, for and in respect only of such Pains, Penalties, and Forfeitures, (not extending to Life) as shall be thought fit to be inflicted on them by another Act, intended to be hereafter passed for that purpose".

One of the people to benefit directly from the Act was John Milton, who was released from prison.

Overview of sections
Sections:

Timeline for the English legislation
 9 May 1660: Pardon and Oblivion, First reading.
 12 May 1660: Pardon and Oblivion, Second reading.
 17 May 1660: Bill of Pardon and Oblivion, to go to committee.
 11 July 1660 Pardon and Oblivion, That the Title of this Bill be, "An Act of free and general Pardon, Indemnity, and Oblivion" Passed and was sent to the House of Lords.
 20 July 1660: Proceedings of Regicide, Ordered, That the Instrument for proclaiming the High Court of Justice for judging of the late King's Majesty, together with the Journal of their Proceedings, be sent to the Lords, to be by them made use of.
 7 August 1660: Lords reminded of Bills, including "The Act of General Pardon, Indemnity, and Oblivion".
 11 August 1660: Pardon and Oblivion, back from House of Lords with Provisoes, Alterations, and Additions. Passed to committee.
 13 August 1660: passed amendments and the Bill was sent to the House of Lords.
 16 August 1660: Lords desired a conference concerning the Act of Indemnity.
 28 August 1660: Pardon and Oblivion, the House agreed to the final amendments to which a joint house conference had agreed and ordered that the Bill of "General Pardon, Indemnity, and Oblivion" be sent to the Lords, as it was now amended. The reply came back from the House of Lords that his Majesty would "be pleased to come To-morrow Morning, to pass the Bill, as is desired".
 29 August 1660: Bills passed. One of which was "An Act of Free and General Pardon, Indemnity, and Oblivion".

The Act was repealed by the Statute Law Revision Act 1948.

Irish Act
An Irish act by the same name "An Act of Free and General Pardon, Indemnity, and Oblivion [for Ireland]" was sent to the Duke of Ormonde on 16 August 1664 by Sir Paul Davys, the Irish Secretary of State.

In popular culture
The Act forms the basis for Robert Harris's 2022 novel Act of Oblivion .

See also
 Act of General Pardon and Oblivion 1652
 Act of Indemnity and Free Pardon 1659
 Act of indemnity and oblivion (Scotland) 1662

References
 Charles II, 1660: An Act of Free and Generall Pardon Indemnity and Oblivion, Statutes of the Realm: volume 5: 1628–80 (1819), pp. 226–34.

Footnotes

External links
Pepys Diary: Thursday 30 August 1660

1660 in law
1660 in England
Acts of the Parliament of England
Pardon legislation
Stuart England
Political history of England